Bryan Labissiere (born 11 February 1997) is a professional footballer who plays as a forward and midfielder for Championnat National 2 club Épinal. Born in France, he is a former Haiti international.

International career
Labissiere represented France at under-16 level. On 29 May 2018, he made his international debut for Haiti in a friendly match against Argentina.

References

1997 births
Living people
Citizens of Haiti through descent
Haitian footballers
Haiti international footballers
Association football forwards
Association football midfielders
Championnat National 2 players
SO Romorantin players
US Saint-Malo players
Footballers from Paris
French footballers
France youth international footballers
French sportspeople of Haitian descent